Theodoros Manolopoulos (Omvriaki, Xyniada, 1900 – 16 October 1981) was a Greek physician specialising in pathology, alumnus of the Department of Medicine of the University of Athens, who acted as MP, Μinister for Social Welfare, and Minister for Northern Greece.

References 

Ministers for Northern Greece
People from Phthiotis
1900 births
1981 deaths
Greek MPs 1935–1936
Greek MPs 1946–1950
Greek MPs 1950–1951
Greek MPs 1951–1952
Greek MPs 1952–1956
Greek MPs 1961–1963
Greek MPs 1964–1967
National and Kapodistrian University of Athens alumni
Greek pathologists